Veronika Pincová (born 15 November 1989) is a former Czech football defender, who played for Slavia Prague in the Czech Women's First League. She was a member of the Czech national team for over a decade. Pincová was voted footballer of the year at the 2011 Czech Footballer of the Year (women).

International career
She made her debut for the national team on 27 October 2007 in a UEFA Euro qualification match against Spain.

References

External links

 

1989 births
Living people
Czech women's footballers
Czech Republic women's international footballers
Sportspeople from Příbram
Women's association football defenders
SK Slavia Praha (women) players
Czech Women's First League players